Corporal John F. Benjamin was an American soldier who fought in the American Civil War. Benjamin was awarded the country's highest award for bravery during combat, the Medal of Honor, for his action during the Battle of Sayler's Creek in Virginia on 6 April 1865. He was honored with the award on 3 May 1865.

Medal of Honor citation

See also

 Battle of Sayler's Creek
 List of American Civil War Medal of Honor recipients: A–F

References

People of New York (state) in the American Civil War
Union Army soldiers
United States Army Medal of Honor recipients
American Civil War recipients of the Medal of Honor